The Roding River is a river of the Tasman Region of New Zealand's South Island. It flows generally southwest from its sources in the hills above the city of Nelson, reaching the Wairoa River five kilometres south of Richmond. The rock type Rodingite is named after the Roding River. The catchment has numerous mine sites and shafts which attempted to make the copper and chromite deposites in the Dun Mountain Ophiolite Belt profertable in the late 19th century.

See also
List of rivers of New Zealand

References

Sources

Rivers of the Tasman District
Geography of Nelson, New Zealand
Rivers of New Zealand